Ronald Hugh Morris (born April 27, 1935) is a retired American track and field athlete who won the national title in pole vault in 1958, 1961 and 1962. He placed fourth at the 1959 Pan American Games and second at the 1960 Summer Olympics.   Morris vaulted 15'-0" June 1971 for a Masters M35 World Record at the 1971 Los Angeles Senior Olympics. After retiring from competitions, he worked as athletics coach.

His athletic and coaching experience includes:
 1952–1953 Two time California Interscholastic Pole Vault and U.S. Interscholastic Record Holder
 1955–1957 Twice Intercollegiate All-American and University of Southern California Pole Vault Record Holder
 1956 Sixth man in history to clear 15 feet
 1956–1966 Eight times AAU All-American – ranked in the top 10 in the world for ten years
 1960 Silver Medal in XVII Olympiad, Rome, Italy
 1962 Only World Class athlete to successfully convert from steel to fiberglass (ranked #1 in the world that year)
 1978 Ranked by Track and Field News as the 2nd Best Pole Vaulter (longevity) in history
 1960–1978 Track Coach at California State University, Los Angeles (prepared several All-American athletes)
 1978–present Owner and operator of On Track

References

External links

 Ron Morris pole vaulting at the 1960 Olympics
 CEO of On Track

Living people
1935 births
Sportspeople from Glendale, California
Track and field athletes from California
American male pole vaulters
Olympic male pole vaulters
Olympic silver medalists for the United States in track and field
Athletes (track and field) at the 1960 Summer Olympics
Medalists at the 1960 Summer Olympics
Pan American Games track and field athletes for the United States
Athletes (track and field) at the 1959 Pan American Games
USA Outdoor Track and Field Championships winners
Japan Championships in Athletics winners